Johan Aadolf "Jukka" Matilainen (20 December 1901 – 1 November 1967) was a Finnish runner. He competed at the 1928 Olympics in the 400 m hurdles, but failed to reach the final. His brothers Kalle and Martti were also Olympic runners, but in longer-distance events.

References

1901 births
1967 deaths
Athletes (track and field) at the 1928 Summer Olympics
Olympic athletes of Finland
Finnish male hurdlers
People from Mikkeli
Sportspeople from South Savo